Farah Ann binti Abdul Hadi (born 3 May 1994) is a Malaysian former artistic gymnast.

Early life
Farah was born in Subang Jaya, Selangor, to a Malaysian father, Abdul Hadi Ahmad and a Canadian mother, Kimberly Ann Gagnon on 3 May 1994. She is the second of three children and her sister, Katrina Ann, is a former national synchronized swimmer.

Career 
She took up gymnastics at age three and started to compete at the national level competition Sukma Games. Farah Ann made her first appearance at the 2010 Games in New Delhi, scoring 12.050 points (floor exercise), 10.500 (beam) and 10.250 (uneven bars) as Malaysia finished fourth in the team event. In 2014, Farah Ann then took up the bronze in the floor exercise and the team event at the Artistic Celtic Cup-Commonwealth Invitational in Perth, Scotland. Later that year, she finished in 11th place out of 24 gymnasts in the women’s individual all-round finals at the Commonwealth Games in Glasgow, Scotland.  After the Commonwealth Games, she competed in the Asian Games in Incheon, South Korea. During the qualification stage, she placed sixth on the vaults (13.650 points), sixth in the uneven bars (12.800), 12th in the balance beam (12.250) and fourth in the floor exercise (13.050). She made it to the finals in the floor exercise, and finished 7th.

In 2015, she competed at the Southeast Asian Games (SEA Games), competing in all events — bars, beam, vaults, floor exercise, individual and team — in the preliminary round of the competition and made it to the finals of all events. She took up her first gold medal in the team event, followed by a second in the floor exercise. She then gained a silver medal each in both the uneven bars, and individual events. The Malaysian gymnast won bronze medals in  the vault, balance beam, as well as the uneven bars event, where another Malaysian gymnast Tan Ing Yueh took the gold.

After barely missing Rio 2016, she qualified for the Tokyo 2020 Olympics when she finished 59th out of 180 gymnasts in the qualifying session of the individual all-around event at the 2019 World Artistic Gymnastics Championships in Stuttgart, Germany. She is only the third Malaysian gymnast to qualify for the Olympics, after Au Li Yen in Sydney 2000 and Ng Shu Wai in Athens 2004.

On 12 March 2022, she announced her retirement from the career through her social media and expressed her appreciation to the people and the opportunity of being in the career which she worked hard in as being described by her as "the people I have met along the way, to all the guidance, love and support, thank you. It has been a ride of a lifetime, giving everything that I have, all my love, passion and dedication".

Awards and nominations

References

External links 
 
  (2010)
  (2014)
 
 
 

1994 births
Living people
People from Selangor
Malaysian Muslims
Malaysian people of Malay descent
Malaysian people of Canadian descent
Malaysian female artistic gymnasts
Gymnasts at the 2014 Asian Games
Gymnasts at the 2018 Asian Games
Gymnasts at the 2014 Commonwealth Games
Southeast Asian Games gold medalists for Malaysia
Southeast Asian Games silver medalists for Malaysia
Southeast Asian Games bronze medalists for Malaysia
Southeast Asian Games medalists in gymnastics
Competitors at the 2011 Southeast Asian Games
Competitors at the 2015 Southeast Asian Games
Competitors at the 2017 Southeast Asian Games
Competitors at the 2019 Southeast Asian Games
Asian Games competitors for Malaysia
Commonwealth Games competitors for Malaysia
Competitors at the 2019 Summer Universiade
Gymnasts at the 2020 Summer Olympics
Olympic gymnasts of Malaysia
21st-century Malaysian women